Vestal Fire is a 1927 comedy novel by the British writer Compton Mackenzie. It was inspired by the time Mackenzie had spent living in Capri before the First World War.

References

Bibliography
 David Joseph Dooley. Compton Mackenzie. Twayne Publishers, 1974.
 Andro Linklater. Compton Mackenzie: A Life Hogarth Press, 1992.

External links
 Full text of Vestal Fire at HathiTrust Digital Library

1927 British novels
Novels by Compton Mackenzie
British comedy novels
Cassell (publisher) books
George H. Doran Company books